Clément Sibony (born 30 November 1976) is a French actor and film director. He has appeared in more than 60 films and television shows since 1991. He won the award for Best Actor at the 22nd Moscow International Film Festival for his role in Taking Wing.

Selected filmography
 French Kiss (1995)
 Déjà mort (1998)
 Cours Toujours (2000)
 Taking Wing (2000)
 He Loves Me... He Loves Me Not (2002)
 Let My People Go! (2011)
 Voir la mer (2011)
 Pour une femme (2013)
 Not to Be (2013) (short film, director)
 The Hundred-Foot Journey (2014)
 The Walk (2015)
 Altamira (2016)

References

External links

1976 births
Living people
French male film actors
Male actors from Paris
20th-century French male actors
21st-century French male actors
French film directors
French male television actors
French male stage actors